Enrique García-Herreros Codesido (29 December 1903 - 18 September 1977) was a Spanish humorist, drafter, poster artist, filmmaker and mountaineer.

Luis García Berlanga defined him as the one who invented the promotion and advertising. He found out Nati Mistral and he was the personal manager of Sara Montiel until 12 December 1963.

He died from an accident while climbing Cornión, Picos de Europa, on 18 September 1977.

He was married to the Olympic sportswoman Ernestina Maenza Fernández-Calvo, with whom he had a child.

Filmography

As actor
 La vida es magnífica (1965) 
 Cabaret (1953) as Señor en baño 
 De Madrid al cielo (1952) 
 El gran Galeoto (1951) as Nicasio Heredia de la Escosura 
 La revoltosa (1950) as Mozo de cuerda 
 Aventuras de Juan Lucas (1949) 
 Don Quijote de la Mancha (1947) as Doctor Pedro Recio
 Senda ignorada (1946) as Espectador 
 Cinco lobitos (1945) 
 Espronceda (1945) as Padrino 2 
 La vida en un hilo (1945) as Taxista
 El fantasma y Dª Juanita (1945) as El faquir 
 El destino se disculpa (1945) as Empresario 
 El clavo (1944) as Señor bajito 
 Eloísa está debajo de un almendro (1943) as Acomodador del cine 
 Yo quiero que me lleven a Hollywood (1931)

As director
 La muralla feliz (1948)
 María Fernanda, la Jerezana (1947)
 Al pie del Almanzor (1942)

As producer
 Noches de Casablanca (1963)

References

External links
 

1903 births
1977 deaths
Draughtsmen
Spanish poster artists
Film directors from Madrid
Spanish mountain climbers
Spanish cartoonists
Mountaineering deaths
Sport deaths in Spain